The  opened in Kobe, Japan in 1982. It is one of Japan's many museums which are supported by a municipality.

The museum resulted from the merger of the Municipal Archaeological Art Museum and Municipal Namban Art Museum. The museum is housed in a neoclassical building built in 1935: the former Kobe branch of the Yokohama Specie Bank. The collection of nearly thirty-nine thousand items comprises archaeological artifacts, works of art, old maps, and historical documents and artifacts relating to Kobe. It includes an important collection of Nanban art (the former Hajime Ikenaga Collection), as well as a set of dōtaku and other items of the Yayoi period from excavations at Sakuragaoka that have been designated a National Treasure.

See also
Namban Art
Japanese museums

References

External links

 Kobe City Museum homepage
 Kobe City Museum e-guide

City museums in Japan
Museums in Kobe
Archaeological museums in Japan
Art museums and galleries in Kobe
Art museums established in 1982
1982 establishments in Japan
Registered Monuments of Japan